Balthazar Seydoux de Clausonne (born 13 August 1971) is a Monegasque politician. Since 2018, he is a member of the National Council of Monaco and a president of the Finance and National Economy Commission. He was named Vice President of the National Council following the 2023 elections.

Life 
Balthazar Seydoux was born on 13 August 1971 in Paris. He graduated from Paris Descartes University with a master's degree in Business Law (DESS).

Seydoux started his career at the Pechiney subsidiary as a financial controller in Paris. Later he worked as a financial controller at Disney Partner Group Russell Reynolds Associates for five years. In 2003, Seydoux founded his own recruitment company Human Asset Executive Search.

Political career 
In 2018, Seydoux was elected as a member of the National Council of Monaco from the political group Primo! (Priority Monaco). He was appointed as a President of the Finance and National Economy Commission. In December 2020, Seydoux spoke in the National Council on behalf the Primo! majority regarding the review of the budget for 2021.

Personal life 
Seydoux is married and has two daughters. His wife Annabelle Jaeger-Seydoux is in charge of the energy transition mission since 2019.

References 

Living people
1971 births
Priorité Monaco politicians
Members of the National Council (Monaco)